Darreh Bid (also Romanized as Darreh Bīd; also known as Darreh Bīd-e Mollā Mīrzā) is a village in Dalankuh Rural District, in the Central District of Faridan County, Isfahan Province, Iran. At the 2006 census, its population was 2,540, in 654 families.

References 

Populated places in Faridan County